Dietz Angerer (born 26 January 1904, date of death unknown) was an Austrian sailor. He competed in the O-Jolle event at the 1936 Summer Olympics.

References

External links
 

1904 births
Year of death missing
Austrian male sailors (sport)
Olympic sailors of Austria
Sailors at the 1936 Summer Olympics – O-Jolle
Place of birth missing